Events in the year 1949 in Israel.

Incumbents
 Prime Minister of Israel – David Ben-Gurion (Mapai)
 President of Israel – Chaim Weizmann (until 17 February, President (or Chairman) of the Provisional State Council)
 President of the Supreme Court – Moshe Smoira
 Chief of General Staff - Yaakov Dori until 9 November, Yigal Yadin
 Government of Israel - 1st Government of Israel, from 10 May

Events

 7 January – Operation Horev ends. On the same day, the Israeli Air Force and ground forces shoot down five Royal Air Force fighter planes and severely damage another in two incidents over the Sinai Peninsula, after mistaking them for Egyptian planes. Two pilots are killed during the incident.
 24 January – The British begin sending the final group of 11,000 illegal Jewish immigrants who were still being held in internment camps on Cyprus, mainly men of military age, to Israel.
 25 January – The first Israeli legislative election is held in which David Ben-Gurion becomes Prime Minister.
 31 January – The United States grants de jure recognition to the State of Israel.
 11 February - The last detainees of the Cyprus internment camps depart for Israel.
 14 February – The Knesset (Israeli parliament) convenes for the first time.
 16 February – In the first Israeli Presidential Election, the Knesset elects Chaim Weizmann (the temporary head of state as head of the Provisional State Council), as President of Israel, by a majority of 83 to 15 votes caste in favour of his opponent, Joseph Klausner. He assumes office the following day as the first president of the State of Israel.
 24 February – The armistice agreement between Israel and Egypt is signed in Rhodes.
 5 March – Israel launches Operation Ovda with the objective of capturing the southern Negev desert.
 10 March – The Israel Defense Forces reach Umm Rashrash, west of Aqaba (the biblical Elath), and capture it without a battle. The Negev Brigade and Golani Brigade takes part in the operation. To symbolize their victory, they raise the Ink Flag, a makeshift flag created from a white sheet and a bottle of ink.
 23 March – The armistice agreement between Israel and Lebanon is signed.
 3 April – The armistice agreement between Israel and Jordan is signed in Rhodes.
 26 April - Austerity is introduced to cope with a lack of foreign currency reserves and a mass influx of Jewish immigrants.
 27 April – Opening of the Lausanne Conference, established by the United Nations with the aim of reaching a comprehensive peace agreement between Israel and Arab countries.
 11 May – Israel is admitted to the United Nations as its 59th member.
 20 July – Israel and Syria sign a truce to end their 19-month war.

Post-war:
 17 August – The remains of Theodor Herzl are buried in Mount Herzl in Jerusalem.
 4 October - The Israeli government decides to incorporate Jaffa into Tel Aviv, although actual unification would be delayed for months due to opposition from Tel Aviv's mayor Israel Rokach.
 8 September - The Knesset passes the Defense Service Law, providing for a period of mandatory military service for citizens.
 9 November – Yigael Yadin is appointed as the second Chief of Staff of the Israel Defense Forces, succeeding Yaakov Dori.
 5 December – Prime Minister Ben-Gurion proclaims Jerusalem as Israel's capital.
 13 December - The Mossad is established as the "Central Institute for Coordination". On the same day, the Knesset votes to transfer the seat of government to Jerusalem from Tel Aviv.
 26 December - The first Knesset meeting in Jerusalem is held, inside the Jewish Agency building.

Israeli–Palestinian conflict 

The most prominent events related to the Israeli–Palestinian conflict which occurred during 1949 include:
 20 March - 50 Israeli soldiers order 1,800 civilians to leave the village of Beit 'Awwa. UN report 7,000 people driven out of area west of Dura.
 31 March - An Israeli command car is ambushed near Al Qubeiba. All four occupants are killed.
 September - Ar Reina: IDF troops execute 14 Bedouin and one woman suspected of smuggling.
 7 October - Four killed by an Israeli mortar attack on Beit Hanun
 2 November - 2,000 Bedouin expelled from the Beersheba area to West Bank.

Unknown dates

Notable births
 21 January – Shlomo Gronich, Israeli musician.
 26 July – Yitzhak Ben Yisrael, Israeli military scientist, general, and politician.
 25 August – Gene Simmons, Israeli-American musician, lead singer and bass guitarist of Kiss.
 12 October – Galila Ron-Feder Amit, Israeli author.
 21 October – Benjamin Netanyahu, Prime Minister of Israel
28 October – Sandra Sade, Israeli actress
 2 November – Miki Gavrielov, Israeli musician
 24 November – Shosh Atari, Israeli radio presenter and actress (died 2008).
 26 November – Shlomo Artzi, Israeli singer.
 30 November – Matti Caspi, Israeli singer.
 25 December – Miri Aloni, Israeli singer.
 28 December – Rachel Elior, Israeli academic, professor of Jewish philosophy

Notable deaths
 Yitzhaq Shami (born 1888), writer, one of the first modern Hebrew literature writers in Palestine
 Meir Bar-Ilan (born 1880), rabbi, leader of the Mizrachi movement
 Elisheva Bikhovski (born 1888), Russian-Israeli poet, writer, literary critic and translator

Major public holidays

See also
 1949 in Israeli film

References

External links